The 2000–01 National Soccer League season, was the 25th season of the National Soccer League in Australia.

Regular season

League table

Finals series

Bracket

Elimination finals
Melbourne Knights 0–0 : 2–2 Perth Glory
Sydney Olympic 3–1 : 2–0 Marconi Fairfield

Minor semi-final
Melbourne Knights 0–1 Sydney Olympic

Major semi-final
Wollongong Wolves 2–1 : 2–1 South Melbourne

Preliminary final
South Melbourne 2–0 Sydney Olympic

Grand final

References

Australia - List of final tables (RSSSF)

National Soccer League (Australia) seasons
1
1
Aus
Aus